Winder Vladimir Mendoza Ramírez (born 9 December 1984), better known as Winder Mendoza, is a professional footballer who plays as a right-back for the club Cibao. Born in Venezuela, he represents the Dominican Republic national football team.

Mendoza spent the early part of his career in his native Venezuela playing for UCV, Yaracuyanos, Atlético Venezuela and SC Guaraní. He then emigrated to the Dominican Republic, and played for Barcelona Atlético, Inter RD and San Francisco before transferring to Cibao FC on 17 March 2019.

International career
Mendoza made his professional debut for the Dominican Republic national football team in a 1-0 friendly over win Guadeloupe on 15 February 2019, and scored his side's only goal.

References

External links
 Soccerway Profile
 ZeroZero Profile

1984 births
Living people
Footballers from Caracas
Dominican Republic footballers
Dominican Republic international footballers
Dominican Republic people of Venezuelan descent
Venezuelan emigrants to the Dominican Republic
Atlético Venezuela C.F. players
Association football fullbacks